The Western Morning News is a daily regional newspaper founded in 1860, and covering the West Country including Devon, Cornwall, the Isles of Scilly and parts of Somerset and Dorset in the South West of England.

Organisation
The Western Morning News is published by Reach Plc.  Its main office is based in Plymouth. Philip Bowern is Editor.

History
The Western Morning News was founded on 3 January 1860, by William Saunders and Edward Spender, father of Sir Wilfrid Spender. It has been published continuously since the first edition, including throughout the 1926 General Strike and the Plymouth Blitz. By 1920, the Devon newspaper market was getting cramped, with all papers running into financial difficulties. In the same year, Sir Leicester Harmsworth acquired the Western Morning News; from 1 February 1921, the Western Daily Mercury and Western Evening Herald were also taken over, with the papers continuing to be published from the old Mercury offices in Frankfort Street. Shortly before World War II, new offices were constructed on the same site after the demolition of the previous premises; the modern construction allowed the offices to survive the Blitz and publishing continued there until the move to Derriford.

On 8 February 1997, the Western Morning News followed most local newspapers in the UK and changed format from broadsheet to tabloid. In 2012, Local World acquired the ownership of Northcliffe Media from Daily Mail and General Trust, The paper had a short-lived Sunday edition from June 2014 until January 2016. In November 2015, Trinity Mirror purchased Local World. In 2018 Trinity Mirror rebranded as Reach Plc. Reach Plc is one of Britain's biggest newspaper groups.

Readership and website
The Western Morning News is published six days a week and aims to provide readers with regional, national and international news with a consistent editorial standpoint. Supplements cover a range of topics, including:
 Westcountry Farming (Wednesday)
 Westcountry Business (Thursday)
 Westcountry Motoring (Friday)
 Westcountry Horses (Friday)
 Westcountry Antiques (Saturday)
 Westcountry Property (Saturday)
 Westcountry Weekend (Saturday)

In literature
Sherlock Holmes: "The detection of [printing] types is one of the most elementary branches of knowledge to the special expert in crime, though I confess that once when I was very young I confused the Leeds Mercury with the Western Morning News." (The Hound of the Baskervilles, Ch. 5).

See also

 Eastern Morning News, founded by William Saunders, 1864, published in Kingston upon Hull, Yorkshire
 List of newspapers in the United Kingdom

References

External links
 Official website

Publications established in 1860
Northcliffe Media
Companies based in Plymouth, Devon
Newspapers published in Cornwall
Newspapers published in Devon
Newspapers published in Dorset
Newspapers published in Somerset
Mass media in Plymouth, Devon
Daily newspapers published in the United Kingdom
1860 establishments in England